A works council is a shop-floor organization representing workers that functions as a local/firm-level complement to trade unions but is independent of these at least in some countries. Works councils exist with different names in a variety of related forms in a number of European countries, including Britain (joint consultative committee or employees’ council); Germany and Austria (Betriebsrat); Luxembourg (comité mixte, délégation du personnel); the Netherlands (Dienstcommissie, Ondernemingsraad) and Flanders in Belgium (ondernemingsraad); Italy (comitato aziendale);  France (comité social et économique); Wallonia in Belgium (conseil d'entreprise), Spain (comité de empresa) and Denmark (Samarbejdsudvalg or SU).

One of the most commonly examined (and arguably most successful) implementations of this institution is found in Germany.  The model is basically as follows:  general labour agreements are made at the national level by national unions (e.g. IG Metall) and German Employer Associations (e.g. Gesamtmetall), and local plants and firms then meet with works councils to adjust these national agreements to local circumstances. Works council members are elected by the company workforce for a four-year term. They don't have to be union members; works councils can also be formed in companies where neither the employer nor the employees are organized.

Works council representatives may also be appointed to the board of directors.

As with co-determination, there are three main views about why works councils primarily exist: to reduce workplace conflict by improving and systematising communication channels; to increase bargaining power of workers at the expense of owners by means of legislation; and to correct market failures by means of public policy.

Europe 

On 22 September 1994, the Council of the European Union passed a Directive (94/45/EC) on the establishment of a European Works Council (EWC) or similar procedure for the purposes of informing and consulting employees in companies which operate at European Union level.

The EWC Directive applies to companies with at least 1,000 employees within the EU and at least 150 employees in each of at least two EEA countries.

European Works Councils were created partly as a response to increased transnational restructuring brought about by the Single European Act. They give representatives of workers from all European countries in big multinational companies a direct line of communication to top management. They also make sure that workers in different countries are all told the same thing at the same time about transnational policies and plans. Lastly, they give workers’ representatives in unions and national works councils the opportunity to consult with each other and to develop a common European response to employers’ transnational plans, which management must then consider before those plans are implemented.

The EWC Directive was revised by the Council and the European Parliament in May 2009.  The changes contained in the new ("Recast") Directive must be transposed into national law by 5 June 2011, and have important implications for all companies in scope of the legislation, both those with an existing European Works Council and those yet to have set one up.

A similar transnational consultative body exists for employees of Societates Europaeae, called SE-Representative-Body or SE Works Council. This went into effect in 2004 with the Employee Involvement Directive (2001/86/EC). SE Works Councils are comparable with European Works Councils according to the European Trade Union Institute.

France
A comité d’entreprise (C.E. or works council) was mandatory in any company with 50 employees or more. It is being replaced by the Comité social et économique (CSE or Business and Social Council) which must have been rolled out in all companies where applicable for 1 January 2020 the latest.  Members of the CE are elected by all the employees, and have 20 hours of delegation per month. The main role of the CE or the CSE is being the interface between the employees and the members of the board which is constituted of the Chairman and the HR Director, mostly for collective issues, such as work organisation, training policy, benefits.  Its consultation is compulsory in case of certain economic events, such as any company strategic moves,  The number of members depends on the number of people in the company. All members of the CE or CSE have a monthly meeting with the board, in which very specific points are dealt with.

Germany 
Works councils (singular: ,) in Germany have a long history, with their origins in the early 1920s in the post World War I Weimar Republic, established by the Works Councils Act (Betriebsrätegesetz), later updated in 1952 with the establishment of the Works Constitution Act in West Germany. Initially, unions were very skeptical of works councils, seeing them as a way for management to negotiate with employees without collective bargaining, but eventually they developed clearly defined responsibilities with works councils forbidden from calling for strikes or negotiating wage increase. In recent years with a decline in union membership, works councils have come to be seen as a way for unions to recruit members, specifically by having works councils campaign for people to join them. Having a works council is formally mandatory, but there is no enforcement as long as the employees do not explicitly ask for an election of one; and their presence differs by economic sector. In 2019, depending on sector, between 16% and 86% of employees worked at an employer with a works council.

While membership in a trade union is explicitly not required, according to the Hans Böckler Stiftung analysis of year 2014 Works Council elections, depending on sector; between 60 to 80% of Works Councillors elected were members of affiliated trade unions in the German Trade Union Confederation.

In Germany, they serve two functions. The first is called co-determination, through which works councils elect members of the board of directors of German companies. The second is called participation, and means that works councils must be consulted about specific issues and have the right to make proposals to management. One of the most impressive achievements of the councils is producing harmonious relations between management and workers, leading to a situation with strong unions and a low strike rate. This also allows for a lot of coordination between the firm and the workers, resulting in, for example, the ability of many German firms to dramatically scale back the hours of each worker without large scale layoffs during the 2008 financial crisis, and then slowly scaling back up as the recovery took effect. This was all assisted by the Kurzarbeit (short time work), a fund that helps workers who have had their hours reduced.

Works councils in Germany have been correlated with a number of positive effects. They promote higher wages, even more than collective bargaining (although situations with both will promote wages the highest), they make firms more productive (although the degree to which they increase productivity can be hard to measure). and they don’t inhibit investment or innovation. Works councils have also been shown to help women, East German, and foreign workers. However, they are correlated lower profitability, likely since they tend to bring higher wages, and there may not be as much benefit in smaller companies as there is in larger ones.

Obstruction of the Works Council  is a criminal offence.

Youth and trainees council 
A Youth and Trainees council (German: Jugend- und Auszubildendenvertretung; JAV) is a workers' representation of all workers below the age of 18 and in-plant training employees (trainees, apprentices, working students) below the age of 25, as described in the Betriebsverfassungsgesetz. It only exists if a Betriebsrat is elected in the company.

See also
 Co-determination
 Workers' council

References

Further reading
 European Commission (2008) Employee representatives in an enlarged Europe (2 volumes). Luxembourg: Office for Official Publications of the European Communities.  (Volume 1),  (Volume 2).
 Fitzgerald, I., Stirling, J. 2004. European Works Councils: Pessimism of the Intellect, Optimism of the Will?, London, Routledge.
 Lecher, W., Platzer, H., Rub, S., Weiner, K. 2002. European Works Councils: Negotiated Europeanisation: Between Statutory Framework and Social Dynamics, London, Ashgate.
 Thelen, Kathleen.  1993.  West European Labor in Transition:  Sweden and Germany Compared.  World Politics 46, no. 1 (October): 23-49.
 Turner, Lowell.  1998.  Fighting for Partnership:  Labor and Politics in Unified Germany.  Ithaca, New York:  Cornell University Press.

External links
 European Commission: European Works Council legislation
 Tasks, rights and duties of works council (German)
 ETUC: On the offensive for stronger European Works Councils
ETUI: Worker-Participation.eu

Labour law
Works council